Martinsburg Mining, Manufacturing & Improvement Co. Historic District is a national historic district located at Martinsburg, Berkeley County, West Virginia. It encompasses 289 contributing buildings located within 19 city blocks and built between 1891 and 1952.  It includes a residential area developed by the Martinsburg Mining, Manufacturing & Improvement Co. as worker housing.  They are one to -story, single family, detached, semi-detached, and multi-unit housing built in wood frame, brick or brick veneer, and concrete block. Also located in the district is the Gothic Revival-style St. Luke's United Methodist Church. It includes examples of vernacular interpretations of popular architectural styles including Queen Anne, American Four Square, and Bungalow styles.

It was listed on the National Register of Historic Places in 2002.

References

Historic districts in Berkeley County, West Virginia
Historic districts on the National Register of Historic Places in West Virginia
Historic districts in Martinsburg, West Virginia